Murawwat Hussain (8 August 1918 – 25 September 1984) was a Pakistani cricketer and umpire.

A right-handed batsman and medium-pace bowler, Murawwat Hussain played first-class cricket in India and Pakistan from 1935 to 1954, and toured Ceylon with the Pakistan team in 1948-49. In the second of the two matches between Pakistan and Ceylon he made his highest first-class score, 164, and he and Nazar Mohammad put on 269 for the second wicket.

He umpired 52 first-class matches in Pakistan, mostly in Lahore or Bahawalpur, from 1957 to 1978. He stood in one Test match, the First Test of the series between Pakistan and West Indies in 1959, played at the National Stadium, Karachi.

See also
 List of Test cricket umpires

References

External links

1918 births
1984 deaths
Cricketers from Sialkot
Pakistani Test cricket umpires
Pakistani cricketers
Southern Punjab cricketers
Muslims cricketers
Punjab (Pakistan) cricketers